Venezuela competed at the 1992 Summer Paralympics in Barcelona, Spain. 10 competitors from Venezuela won a single bronze medal and finished joint 50th in the medal table with 5 other countries.

See also 
 Venezuela at the Paralympics
 Venezuela at the 1992 Summer Olympics

References 

Venezuela at the Paralympics
1992 in Venezuelan sport
Nations at the 1992 Summer Paralympics